Reid H. Ewing (born June 10, 1947) is an American urban planner and distinguished professor of city and metropolitan planning and a distinguished research chair for resilient places at the University of Utah. Ewing is the director of the Metropolitan Research Center and he a long-time columnist for the planning magazine, Planning Research You Can Use.

Education
Ewing received his Bachelor of Science in Mechanical Engineering from Purdue University, followed by his Master of Science in Engineering and Applied Physics and Master of City Planning from Harvard University. Later on, he earned his Doctor of Philosophy in Urban Planning and Transportation Systems from Massachusetts Institute of Technology.

Research and career
Before entering academia, Ewing served two terms in the Arizona House of Representatives and served as a research associate with the Congressional Budget Office.

Ewing's research is mainly focused on city and transportation planning. His research articles include relationship between urban sprawl and physical activity, obesity and morbidity, travel and the built environment: a synthesis and characteristics, causes and effects of a sprawl: a literature review.

During his tenure at the University of Utah, he has served in different positions including Chair of the Department of City and Metropolitan Planning and Director of the Metropolitan Research Center.

Awards and honors
In 2010, he received the Award for Best Article by the American Planning Association. Ewing received the Award for best papers of the year in 2005 by Institute of Transportation Engineers, District 6. Also, in 1997, he was given the Award for Best Feature by the American Planning Association and in 1993, the Institute of Transportation Engineers awarded him for Best Technical Paper.

Ewing is serving as an Associate Editor of the Journal of the American Planning Association and of Cities. He is also editorial board member for several journals including the Journal of Planning Education and Research and Landscape and Urban Planning.

He is the sixth most highly cited out of 1,100 academic planners in North America.

Bibliography
Ewing has written several books, among them:

 Advanced Quantitative Research Methods for Urban Planners. 2020.
 Best Development Practices: Doing the Right Thing and Making Money at the Same Time. 1996, listed by the American Planning Association as one of the 100 "essential" books in planning over the past 100 years.
 Growing Cooler: The Evidence on Urban Development and Climate Change. 2008.

Publications
 Ewing has published more than 100 peer reviewed articles. Reid Ewing and Robert Cervero. "Travel and the Built Environment: A Meta-Analysis". Journal of the American Planning Association.
 Reid Ewing, Gail Meakins, Shima Hamidi, and Arthur C.Nelson. "Relationship between urban sprawl and physical activity, obesity, and morbidity – Update and refinement". Journal of Health & Place.
 Reid Ewing. "Characteristics, Causes, and Effects of Sprawl: A Literature Review". Journal of Urban Ecology.
 Reid Ewing, and Susan Handy. "Measuring the Unmeasurable: Urban Design Qualities Related to Walkability". Journal of Urban Design.
 Reid Ewing & Fang Rong. "The impact of urban form on U.S. residential energy use". Journal of Housing Policy Debate.

References 

1945 births
Living people
Purdue University College of Engineering alumni
MIT School of Architecture and Planning alumni
Harvard Graduate School of Design alumni
University of Utah faculty